Dvoynovo is a rural locality (a village) in Ilkinskoye Rural Settlement, Melenkovsky District, Vladimir Oblast, Russia. The population was 256 as of 2010. There are 5 streets.

Geography 
Dvoynovo is located 20 km south of Melenki (the district's administrative centre) by road. Ilkino is the nearest rural locality.

References 

Rural localities in Melenkovsky District